A Throw of Dice (Prapancha Pash) is a 1929 silent film by German-born director Franz Osten, based on an episode from the Indian epic Mahabharata.

Plot summary
The movie is about two kings vying for the love of a hermit's daughter, the beautiful Sunita. The two kings, Ranjit and Sohan, share a passion for gambling and decide to play a game of craps to determine who will marry her. Sunita wishes to marry Ranjit. Ranjit loses the game to the nefarious Sohan and as a forfeit becomes his slave. Sunita soon uncovers the truth about Sohan's evil deeds and to escape punishment he hurls himself off a cliff into the rapids below. Ranjit and Sunita are reunited and married.

Cast
 Seeta Devi as Sunita
 Himansu Rai as Sohan
 Charu Roy as Ranjit
 Modhu Bose
 Sarada Gupta as The Hermit
 Lala Bijoykishen
 Tincory Chakrabarty

Production 

A Throw of Dice, the third Indian film by Franz Osten is considered by many his greatest achievement. The silent film was shot in black and white on 35mm film. It contains thousands of cast members and animals, including 10,000 extras, 1,000 horses and scores of elephants and tigers. The film was shot on location in Rajasthan.
Osten made 19 films in India between 1926 and 1939, and A Throw of Dice formed the final part of a trilogy of Indo-German productions by Osten and Indian actor-producer Himanshu Rai, the other two being Prem Sanyas (1925) and Shiraz (1928). After a gap, Osten returned to India, and worked on Bombay Talkies with Rai. During the production of Kangan (The Bangle) in 1939, Osten, a member of the Nazi Party, was arrested by British colonial officials, and was incarcerated until the end of the Second World War.

Restoration and re-release

A Throw of Dice has been in the British Film Institute (BFI)'s archives since 1945, though rarely seen. In 2006, in honour of the 60th anniversary of Indian independence, the film was digitally restored, then re-released at the Luminato Festival in Toronto, Ontario, Canada, on 13 June 2008, with a new orchestral score by British Indian composer Nitin Sawhney. The United States release occurred on 30 July 2008 during the Grant Park Music Festival at the Jay Pritzker Pavilion in Chicago, Illinois.
Nitin Sawhney, composer of the new 2006 score, describes the film as "A cross between Chaplin, Cecil B. DeMille and an early Bollywood movie." On many occasions, it has been compared to a Cecil B. DeMille film for its levels of extravagance.

Nishat Khan composed a new orchestral score, which premiered on 25 April 2013, as part of the 100 Years of Indian Film festival, at Siri Fort Auditorium in New Delhi, with the composer playing sitar and singing, accompanied by the Bollywood Orchestra.

Reception
Upon its re-release in 2007, a review in The New York Times stated, "There’s hardly a frame in the 1929 film "A Throw of Dice" that doesn’t provide a surge of visual pleasure", while Peter Bradshaw, a reviewer for The Guardian called it, "a rare and fascinating gem". The Observer reviewer, Philip French, termed it, "a remarkable silent movie".

References

External links 

 

1929 films
Indian silent films
Films based on the Mahabharata
Indian black-and-white films
Films directed by Franz Osten
Articles containing video clips
UFA GmbH films
German silent feature films
British silent feature films
German black-and-white films
British black-and-white films
Silent adventure films